Code Red is the fifth and final studio album by the American hip-hop duo DJ Jazzy Jeff & The Fresh Prince, released on October 12, 1993 on Jive Records. The album peaked at number sixty-four on the Billboard 200 and number thirty-nine on the Top R&B/Hip-Hop Albums. On January 14, 1994, the Recording Industry Association of America certified the album gold. Four singles reached the Billboard charts; "Boom! Shake the Room", "I'm Looking for the One (To Be with Me)","I Wanna Rock", and "Can't Wait to Be With You".

Track listing
 "Somethin' Like Dis" – 4:08 
 "I'm Looking for the One (To Be with Me)" – 4:35
 "Boom! Shake the Room" – 3:49
 "Can't Wait to Be with You" (featuring Christopher Williams) – 3:51 
 "Twinkle Twinkle (I'm Not a Star)" – 5:23
 "Code Red" – 3:30
 "Shadow Dreams" – 4:05
 "Just Kickin' It" – 4:11
 "Ain't No Place Like Home" – 5:08
 "I Wanna Rock" – 6:19
 "Scream" – 4:31
 "Boom! Shake the Room" (Street Remix) – 4:30

Samples
Ain't No Place Like Home
"Melody for Thelma" by Blue Mitchell 
"La Di Da Di" by Doug E. Fresh and Slick Rick 
Boom! Shake the Room
"Funky Worm" by Ohio Players
"The Jones' (12" Surgery Mix)" by The Temptations
"Jump" by Kris Kross
Can't Wait to Be With You
"You'll Like It Too" by Funkadelic
"Never Too Much" by Luther Vandross
Code Red
"Atomic Dog" by George Clinton
"Date With The Rain" by Eddie Kendricks
I'm Looking for the One (To Be With Me)
"Funky President" by James Brown
"Tell Me if You Still Care" by The S.O.S. Band
I Wanna Rock
"All Night Long" by Mary Jane Girls
"I Can't Live Without My Radio" by LL Cool J
"It Takes Two" by Rob Base & DJ E-Z Rock
"Think About It" by Lynn Collins 
Just Kickin' It
"Mystic Voyage" by Roy Ayers Ubiquity
Scream
"School Boy Crush" by Average White Band 
"That's the Way (I Like It)" by KC & the Sunshine Band
"Jump" by Kris Kross
Somethin' Like Dis
"Rock Box" by Run-DMC
"La Di Da Di" by Doug E. Fresh and Slick Rick
Twinkle Twinkle (I'm Not a Star)
"It's a New Day" by Skull Snaps
"I Wanna Thank You" by Johnny Guitar Watson
"Black Steel in the Hour of Chaos" by Public Enemy
Boom! Shake the Room (Street Remix)
"Superfluous" by Eddie Harris
"Mama Said Knock You Out" by LL Cool J
"Come In Out of the Rain" by Parliament 
"Wah Wah Man" by Young-Holt Unlimited
"Long Red" by Mountain

Charts

Certifications

References 

1993 albums
DJ Jazzy Jeff & The Fresh Prince albums
Jive Records albums
Albums produced by Dallas Austin
Albums produced by Teddy Riley
Albums produced by Pete Rock